Bralorne is a historic Canadian gold mining community in the Bridge River District of British Columbia, some 130 km on dirt roads west of the town of Lillooet.

Background
Gold has been the central element in the area's history going back to the 1858-1860 Fraser River Gold Rush. Miners rushed to the Cayoosh and Bridge River areas looking for placer deposits, One named Cadwallader looked for the outcroppings on the creek that is now named for him and turned out later to be the site of the richest hard-rock veins in the region. Early exploratory parties of Chinese and Italians in the upper Bridge River basin were driven out by Chief Hunter Jack, who himself had a secret placer mine somewhere in the region, believed to be in upper Tyaughton Creek. and whose big-game hunting territory this also was. During the 1870s Hunter Jack began to invite chosen prospectors into the valley, and ran a ferry across the Bridge River that virtually all entering the region had to cross. Among these were those who would eventually discover the hard rock lodes on Cadwallader Creek. Though styled the Bridge River Gold Rush, in this early period there were so few who had made it into the district that there were only forty residents during the 1890 Census, prompting the naming of one of the claims "Forty Thieves".

Bralorne today

Since 2002 rising gold prices have led to new exploration in the area and plans for re-opening the Bralorne Mine, and nearby Pioneer Mine. In 2014, a realtor put the Bralorne's "third townsite", Bradian, on sale for $1 million. Recently, the entire town was sold for just over one million dollars. It is a ghost town consisting of some 20 dwellings last occupied in the 1970s.

See also
Black Dome Mountain
Ogden, British Columbia
Railroad Pass (British Columbia)

References

External links
 
Bralorne-Pioneer: Their Past Lives Here, Virtualmuseum.ca photo exhibit
Bralorne Gold Mines Ltd.

Bridge River Country
Designated places in British Columbia
Mining communities in British Columbia
Gold mines in British Columbia
Populated places in the Squamish-Lillooet Regional District
Unincorporated settlements in British Columbia
Ghost towns in British Columbia
Company towns in Canada